Lecanactis leprarica is a species of lichen in the family Roccellaceae. Found in Cameroon, it was described as a new species in 2021 by lichenologists Klaus Kalb and André Aptroot. Here it was found growing on tree bark in a forest clearing. The specific epithet leprarica refers to its main secondary chemical, lepraric acid. It also contains norstictic acid as a minor metabolite. Both the thallus and apothecia of the lichen turn red with the K chemical spot test.

References

Roccellaceae
Lichen species
Lichens described in 2021
Lichens of Cameroon
Taxa named by André Aptroot
Taxa named by Klaus Kalb